The Terres Noires Formation is a geologic formation in France. It preserves fossils dating back to the Jurassic period.

See also

 List of fossiliferous stratigraphic units in France

References
 

Jurassic France
Geologic formations of France